EIIR or variation, may refer to:

  or "Elizabeth II Regina", royal cypher of Elizabeth II
 European Institute for International Law and International Relations
 Inisheer Aerodrome (ICAO airport code: EIIR), Inisheer Island, Ireland

See also

 Elizabeth II (disambiguation)
 ER2 (disambiguation)
 EIR (disambiguation)